Tilly-la-Campagne is a former commune in the Calvados department and Normandy region of north-western France. On 1 January 2019, it was merged into the new commune Castine-en-Plaine.

Population

See also
Communes of the Calvados department

References

Former communes of Calvados (department)
Populated places disestablished in 2019